Jesús Caldera Sánchez-Capitán (born 31 October 1957 in Béjar, Salamanca) is a Spanish socialist politician. He holds degrees in political science and sociology from the Complutense University of Madrid and a law degree from UNED.He was Minister of Labor during the eighth legislature of the Spanish government (2008-2011).

Biography 
Born in Béjar (Salamanca Province) in 1957, Jesús Caldera began his career at the beginning of the 1980s when he joined the public administration as a city manager in the province of Salamanca.

He became a member of the Spanish Congress of Deputies for Salamanca Province in the second legislature (1982). After José Luis Rodríguez Zapatero was elected Secretary General of the Spanish Socialist Workers' Party (PSOE), he was named speaker of the Socialist Group (2000–2004).

In the 37th Congress of the Socialist Workers' Party held in July 2008, Caldera was named Secretary of the Ideas and Programs.

Minister of Labour and Social Issues (2004-2008) 

After the PSOE victory in March 2004, President José Luis Rodríguez Zapatero entrusted Caldera with one of the most important responsibilities within the Executive Committee: to lead the Ministry of Labor and Social Issues, an office he assumed on 18 April 2004. Caldera signed over twenty social and labor agreements while leading this ministry.

Key labor reforms: Caldera raised the minimum wage to 600 euros/month, built consensus with social agents for labor reform as well as social security that allowed for the creation of more jobs with permanent contracts and improved payments to the neediest groups, at the same time he guaranteed the future of the system by making early retirement more difficult. Additionally, he brought forward the independent contractors statute and put a plan in place to reduce workplace accidents.

Key social reforms: Caldera created a new right, the right of dependent people to get assistance, raised paternity leave days from four to fifteen. Further, his ministry was charged with migratory policies and (along with social agents) to regularize more than half a million immigrants.

Ideas Foundation for Progress 
After Caldera left the Ministry of Labor in April 2008, it was announced that his new challenge was to create, put in motion and preside over a large think tank, the IDEAS Foundation for progress that would unite the smaller foundations tied to the PSOE.

This foundation's mission would be to create new ideas and projects for the party with the objective of staying abreast of social change and offering up to date solutions.

References

External links 

Jesús Caldera Sánchez-Capitán, Executive Vice President of the IDEAS Foundation

|-

1957 births
Living people
People from Béjar
Spanish Socialist Workers' Party politicians
Labour ministers of Spain
Members of the 2nd Congress of Deputies (Spain)
Members of the 3rd Congress of Deputies (Spain)
Members of the 4th Congress of Deputies (Spain)
Members of the 5th Congress of Deputies (Spain)
Members of the 6th Congress of Deputies (Spain)
Members of the 7th Congress of Deputies (Spain)
Members of the 8th Congress of Deputies (Spain)
Members of the 9th Congress of Deputies (Spain)
Members of the 10th Congress of Deputies (Spain)